Serica ligulata is a species of scarab beetle in the family Scarabaeidae. It is found in North America.

Subspecies
These two subspecies belong to the species Serica ligulata:
 Serica ligulata ligulata Dawson, 1932
 Serica ligulata praetermissa Dawson, 1932

References

Further reading

 

Melolonthinae
Articles created by Qbugbot
Beetles described in 1932